Wesleyan University-Philippines (WU-P) is a private, sectarian, and non-profit higher education institution run by the United Methodist Church (UMC) in Cabanatuan, Nueva Ecija, Philippines. It was founded in 1946 as the Philippine Wesleyan College. It is named after John Wesley, the founder of Methodism. The university offers preschool, grade school, high school undergraduate, and graduate programs. It also initiated the Support for the Handicapped and their Rehabilitation through Education (SHARE) Program, the first school in Central Luzon to integrate hearing-impaired students into mainstream classes.

The university was granted autonomy status by the Commission on Higher Education effective March 11, 2009 – present

History
The university was conceived by a group of Filipino and American Methodists led by the late Rev. Carlos Mañacop Sr. as part of the realization of their ecclesiastic mission. It was founded on July 1, 1946, and was named Philippine Wesleyan College. It was incorporated on April 28, 1948. The institution was named in memory of John Wesley, the founder of Methodism. It started operating in “sawali” and wooden structure erected on an 800-square meter lot at the corner of Quimzon and Mabini Streets in Cabanatuan, with its first set of 19 faculty and staff and batch of 368 students enrolled in Liberal Arts, Education, Elementary and High School programs.  The university was granted government recognition on June 26, 1947, and incorporated on April 28, 1948.

The institution attained its University Status on April 24, 1978, and has since carried the name Wesleyan University-Philippines. Since its elevation to university status, it has grown in terms of academic programs, student enrolment, physical plant and facilities, faculty and staff, research and extension and other support services. It has also expanded its operations. Today, it operates in two campuses, Cabanatuan or the Cushman Campus, and Maria Aurora.

Eleven administrators took turns in steering the growth of Wesleyan University-Philippines. Each contributed in bringing the university to its present glorious status, an esteemed educational landmark in the region. The first president of the institution was Dr. Dionisio D. Alejandro (1946–1947), the first Filipino Bishop of the United Methodist Church of the Philippines. He was succeeded by Rev. Carlos Mañacop Sr. (1947–1952); followed by Dr. Roxy Lefforge (1952–1954); then Dr. Asuncion A. Perez (1954–1967), the first female cabinet member who served as a Social Welfare Administrator under four Philippine presidents. She was followed by Dr. Fidel F. Galang (1967–1970)

In 1970, Dr. Gloria D. Lacson, a former dean of the Mary Johnston College of Nursing was elected as the 6th College president. She served for twenty-four years and was eventually the first university president in 1978 when the institution was granted its university status. During her term, nine new programs were offered and the Information and Development Desk was created which later became the Research and Development Office. It was also under her leadership that the university had enormous improvements in terms of facilities as seen in the construction of several buildings which now house the different academic programs of the university.

Dr. Emmanuel G. Cleto, a former Commissioner of the Civil Service Commission, was appointed president from 1995 to 2000. Two new programs were added in the degree offerings of the university. The four-storey Alejandrino Hall which houses the College of Computer Studies and the three-storey Elementary Building were constructed during his term.

Dr. Zenaida P. Lumba, former president of Harris Memorial College, was elected as the eighth president (2001–2005) and it was during her stewardship that the university attained deregulated status. The Millennium Building was constructed during her term. It now houses the College of Hotel and Tourism Management, Graduate School and Law School. The John Wesley Park which is now the distinct landmark of the university was also constructed.

In 2005, Atty. Guillermo T. Maglaya was elected as the 9th president of the university. During his term, the WUP Cardiovascular Diagnostic Center and Hospital became operational and was dubbed as the Heart Center of the North. It was under his leadership and his vice president for academic affairs, Dr. Anselmo D. Lupdag, that the university was granted a five-year Autonomous Status (2009–2014) by the Commission on Higher Education.

In 2009, Prof. Manuel G. Palomo was elected as the tenth president. He was known for restoration of the Supreme Student Council and implementation of improved salary scheme for faculty and staff. Make-over of the campus physical facilities, refurbishing of buildings, provision of Wi-Fi internet connection and air-conditioned classrooms were accomplished during his tenure. Also, more programs in health sciences were offered thus renaming the College of Nursing as the College of Nursing and Allied Medical Sciences.

In 2012, Hon. Pacifico B. Aniag was elected as the 11th president. He was known for achieving financial stability of the university. Also, five new programs were offered including the Bachelor of Laws. During his term, the university was granted another three years as Autonomous University (2006–2019) by the Commission on Higher Education and Institutional Accreditation by Federation of Accrediting Agencies of the Philippines (FAAP) from September 2014 to April 2018. Two four-storey buildings that replaced the old agricultural building were constructed during his presidency. His graceful exit from office is historic as he was the first president to retire from his post which paved the way for smooth transition of leadership.

On January 24, 2019, Hon. Benjamin D. Turgano, a retired judge and a man of Methodist faith was elected as the 12th president of the university. His election into the University Presidency is historic as he was the first president who was chosen through a search and screening committee.  As a man of law and of God, Hon. Turgano assured the Wesleyan community that under his leadership, no judgment will be rendered unless all sides have been heard. Issues and concerns of different units will be heard through dialogs and collegial discussions. He also emphasized that transparency, efficiency, accountability and continuous improvements will be the standards that will govern the academic and administrative operations and procedures in the university during his presidency.

Mascot, moniker, and colors

The image of Circuit Rider was chosen as the university mascot to signify the clergymen of the Methodist Church who travel around specific geographic territories to minister to settlers and organize congregations. Wesleyan University-Philippines athletic teams are known as The Riders and wear school colors, Green (Pantone 348) and Yellow (Pantone 7548 C).

List of presidents

Achievements

Since its founding in 1946, the Wesleyan community continuously strive to realize its vision, mission and goals and its trifocal philosophies of scholarship, service, and character. Consequently, it has achieved the following:

 It is the only Methodist University in the Philippines
 It was the first private University in Nueva Ecija
 The only Autonomous Private University in Nueva Ecija
 Its Graduate School was the first accredited graduate school in the region
 It is the only university in Nueva Ecija that has a genuine campus radio station
 It was rated ‘Excellent’ in the management assessment conducted by the Institutional Development Program of FAPE in 1987
 It was chosen as one among the Top 21 Universities in the whole country through the 1995 assessment done by the Commission on Higher Education.
 It was one of the 17 Higher Education Institutions in the entire country that was granted an Institutional Accreditation status by the Federation of Accrediting Agencies of the Philippines Board in 2015.

It was the first university in the region to top the board examination for Certified Public Accountants (1985) and for Electronics and Communications Engineers (2002) and has since then a consistent producer of top Examinees in the Licensure Exams in Nursing, Engineering, Criminology, Accountancy, Social work and X-ray Technology and Physical Therapy.

Campus
The university has two campuses in Central Luzon: the Cushman Campus and Aurora Extension Campus.

Cushman Campus is a seven-hectare plus area located at Cabanatuan which was donated by Methodist Bishop Ralph Cushman. The campus was established as the university's center of operation after transferring from the dilapidated Del Pilar Street campus; more than 30 buildings were constructed since the establishment of Cushman Campus.

Methodist missionaries working in Aurora province during the late 1980s established a school in Aurora which they named Wesleyan College. This school was later acquired by the Wesleyan University and developed into WU-P's first campus outside Nueva Ecija.

Organization and administration
The Vice President for Academic Affairs is responsible for the entire academic program of the university. The VPAA is assisted in this regard by the members of the academic council namely:

 Dean of the College of Arts and Sciences;
 Dean of the College of Business and Accountancy;
 Dean of the College of Criminal Justice Education;
 Dean of the College Engineering and Computer Technology;
 Dean of the College of Hospitality and Tourism Management;
 Dean of the College of Education;
 Dean of the College of Nursing and Allied Medical Sciences;
 Dean of the Graduate School;
 Dean of the Wesley Divinity School;
 Dean of the John Wesley School of Law and Governance;
 Elementary Principal;
 High School Principal;
 Chief Librarian;
 University Registrar;
 University Physician;
 Research, Development and Productivity Director;
 Quality Assurance Director;
 Guidance and Placement Director;
 Alumni Affairs Director;
 Extension Programs Director;
 Institute of Music, Performing Arts, and Cultural Traditions Director; and
 Student Affairs Director

Academic programs, majors, courses, and policies are set by the Academic Council, and/or the Board of Trustees. The Registrar and Deans, in conjunction with the Vice President for Academic Affairs, are charged with interpreting and implementing academic policies and regulations concerning such matters as calendar, class attendance, degree requirements, and course offerings. The registrar maintains permanent records for all students.

Accreditation and recognition
The university operates five programs with Level II Accreditation Status as certified by the Federation of Accrediting Agencies of the Philippines (FAAP) and the Association of Christian Schools and Colleges Accrediting Agency, Inc. These programs are the pre-school, elementary, high school, accountancy and the graduate school. The Colleges of Arts and Sciences, Education, and Business Administration have Level III Accreditation status.

In 1990–1991, Wesleyan University-Philippines was identified by the Philippine Association for Teacher Education as the regional center for teacher education. The College of Education serves also as a Teacher-Training Institution (TTI) for the training of secondary Science and Mathematics teachers.

In 1991–1992, WU-P was nominated by the DECS Regional Office III as one of the so-called "excellent schools" in Region III. Likewise, the Philippine Historical Association named WU-P a Regional Nucleus School. The university serves as the seat of the non-government organizations (NGOs) forum in Nueva Ecija and the center for Drug Prevention Education in the province. The College of Technology is a Center of Development for Region III, a recognition granted by the Commission on Higher Education III.

The Commission on Higher Education granted the university a Deregulated Status in 2004. In the most recent evaluation conducted in 2005 by the Commission on Higher Education, the WU-P Graduate School was rated "very good," besting all other schools in Region III including state universities and colleges.

The university has been granted a five-year autonomous status by the Commission on Higher Education effective March 11, 2009. An autonomous status allows universities to design their own curricula, offer new programs and put up branches or satellite campuses without having to secure permits, confer honorary degrees, and carry out operations without much interference from the commission. It is the fourth private school to be granted autonomy in Central Luzon, joining a list of 22 other autonomous private schools nationwide that include Ateneo de Manila, De La Salle,  Assumption College, Miriam College Foundation, St. Joseph's College of Quezon City, University of Santo Tomas and Centro Escolar University, among others.

Student life
The Office for Student Affairs is concerned with all facets of student life on or off campus. The welfare of each student as an individual and as a member of the Wesleyan University-Philippines community is of utmost importance to the student affairs staff. Your concerns may be expressed openly and freely, and they will be heard with interest and consideration. When action is needed, every effort will be made to deal with the matter in a fair and consistent manner.

The university reserves the right to make policy changes between annual editions of this handbook. In the event that such changes are necessary, every effort will be made to communicate them to students.

Sports commission 
The university recognizes different sports as legitimate venues for formation and supports the formation of varsity teams that are allowed to carry the university's official name and represent the institution in University-sanctioned athletics competitions.  These competitions are mostly inter-school or inter-university

The Sports Commission is directly under the administration of the Office for Student Affairs.

Spiritual life 
In a United Methodist institution such as Wesleyan University – Philippines, the Chaplain's Office is composed of the University Chaplain together with special appointees (ordained clergies and commissioned deaconesses) called together by God and appointed by a bishop to minister outside the walls of the church.

Their ministry of witness and service extends God's love and service in various settings and requires specialized training to qualify for endorsement by The United Methodist Church. However, requirements of appointees for institutions such as Wesleyan will be determined by the appropriate institution officials depending on the needs of the institution and submitted to the bishop for proper endorsement. To ensure high standards of competence and uniform standards, the United Methodist Annual Conferences in consultation with the bishop is responsible for enlisting, endorsing, and supporting such workers serving in ministries of specialized settings. The primary difference between these appointments and those to local churches is the nature of the institution and the role of the church workers in relationship to institutions with the primary purpose of providing witness and service of Christ's love and justice.

Ministries and functions

Wesleyan University – Philippines as a United Methodist academic institution through the Office of the Chaplain seeks to support a diversity of Christian beliefs respecting other denomination through the multi-faith character of its ministries by providing an ecumenical atmosphere throughout the university.

Under the Chaplain's office with the leadership of the University Chaplain, church workers under special appointments are altogether responsible for the spiritual oversight of the administrative and academic officials, faculty, staff and students of the university community; it coordinates activities that promote holistic development of members of the community; the spiritual upliftment, welfare and growth of the community; providing support services to other related bodies in the university; organize retreats and revival services for the spiritual renewal of the university community. Thus the chaplain's office plans, coordinates, and directs a comprehensive program (of worship, religious activities and programs) to meet the religious and spiritual needs of the entire university community

The Chaplain's office provides pastoral oversight, guidance, care and counseling, and administrative support; coordinates with the Guidance and Counseling Department in providing advisory function for both staff and students.

Spiritual formation opportunities 
Radio Ministry

With the Campus-based radio station (89.7 WUP-FM), students and the surrounding community are being reached out through morning devotion every day from 6AM to 8AM, the two-hour program is composed of spiritual reflection, Christian talks and music.

Regular Weekly Chapel Service

Regular weekly chapel services are being held as per respective colleges/departments depending upon the availability of students. Schedules of such services vary every semester on students’ class schedules being properly coordinated through the office of the college dean and their respective spiritual advisers. There is also a regular Faculty and Staff Convocation every first Monday of the month.

Life Group Ministry

Life Group as small group ministry is also being implemented. On this particular ministry, Life Group student leaders are responsibly coaching other students in their college life and faith journey.

Prayer Works

The Chaplain's office is leading the prayer meeting among the students every Monday.

Faculty and Staff Devotion

The Chaplain also conduct weekly devotion to respective university offices and to the parents/guardians during their stay while waiting for their children.

Special Ministry Services

Deans/Heads of every college coordinate and request with the Chaplains office special spiritual services for students such as consecration of students who are taking their board exams, fellowships, thanksgiving service for birthday and personal special occasion, funeral services and the like. This is also being done to all faculty and staff.

Hospital Ministry

With a hospital being part and parcel of the university, Care Groups and prayer for healing are also being offered.  There are instances that families of hospitalized patients request for special services.

Pastoral Care and Counseling

With the various circumstances affecting the life of every student, the special appointees as campus ministers are making themselves available for pastoral care and counseling.  Newly hired faculty and staff will have to undergo such counseling.

Christian Education Program

Every student undergoes through Christian education program (3 semesters) as part of their academic requirement. This was observed as a good avenue for spiritual formation so at present the syllabus is being studied for revision to cater the contemporary needs of the students.  Every semester there is always a networking gathering /conference of all CE students. There is also a so-called CE Day or Christian Emphasis Day with different activities such as Bible Competition (Quiz, Drill etc.), Film viewing and evangelistic gathering.

Outreach Ministry

Poor communities with informal settlers are also a part of the campus ministry. In partnership with WESCOP (Wesleyan Community Outreach Program), the outreach office of the university. Students are being trained to reach out to the impoverished community by joining and helping in this noble endeavor. Livelihood and spiritual program are being implemented to the respective adapted community. The students together with campus minister assigned are jointly helping with the WESCOOP office to implement sustainable programs.

Members of the board of trustees (as of 2020) 
 Atty. Ephraim B. Cortez, Chairperson
 Hon. Pacifico B. Aniag, Trustee
 Rev. Jonathan R. Ulanday, Trustee
 Rev. Nueriano C. Lasco, Trustee
 Atty. Gideon C. Salatan, Trustee
 Rev. Benedicto M. Dulay, Trustee
 Atty. Cesar R. Villar, Trustee
 Engr. Renato G. Simbulan, Trustee

Honorary Members of the Board of Trustees
 Judge Benjamin d. Turgano (ret.), University president
 Bishop Pedro M. Torio, Baguio Episcopal Area
 Bishop Ciriaco Q. Francisco, Manila Episcopal Area
 Bishop Rodolfo A. Juan, Davao Episcopal Area

Notable alumni

 Ben G. Domingo – Journalism professor, mountain climber, and sportsman; first Filipino accredited as international referee by the Badminton World Federation and the Badminton Asia Confederation.
 Rowena Festin – Writer, winner of the Carlos Palanca Memorial Awards for Literature 
 Patricia Llena – Power lifter and Youth Olympic Gold Medalist
 Jaime J. Bautista – President/CEO, Philippines Airlines and vice chair of the University of the East's (UE) Board of Trustees.
 Dr. Proceso T. Domingo – Undersecretary, Department of National Defense
 Dr. Hilario C. Ortiz – President, Nueva Ecija University of Science and Technology (NEUST)
 Jose Gamboa Jr. – Bishop, United Methodist Church
 Solito K. Toquero – Bishop, United Methodist Church
 Mildred T. Ancheta – 2006 Ten Outstanding Principals of the Philippines Awardee
 Elenita Bautista-Malicse – Outstanding Filipino Nurse Award – Nurse Educator Category
 Elaine Cris N. delos Reyes – 2008 Ayala Young Leader
 Jerome Dayao – 2006 Ten Outstanding Students of the Philippines awardee
 Luzviminda Gutierrez-Palad – Philippine Nurses Association of Metropolitan Houston (PNAMH) Outstanding Filipino Nurse (OFN) Award – Nurse Researcher Category
 Rose Marielle C. Mamaclay – 2008 World Championships of the Performing Arts gold multi-medalist
 Marybeth Ortiz – 2008 Most Outstanding Social Welfare and Development Officers awardee
 Emmy-Lou del Rosario-Sanchez – 2007 Wales Care Awards Nurse of the Year
 Rosalyn "Sirikit" Santiago – 2006 Bb. Pilipinas First Runner-up
 Orlando V. Zarate Jr. – 2008 Ten Most Outstanding Student Nurses of the Philippines
 Melchor O. Camiling – News Correspondent – ABS-CBN Balitang Middle East aired over TFC and ANC.

Honorary alumni
 Jejomar Binay – Vice-President of the Philippines
 Reynato Puno – former Chief Justice
 Fidel V. Ramos – former Philippine president
 Manuel Villar – former Senate president

References

External links
Wesleyan University-Philippines website

Education in Cabanatuan
Educational institutions established in 1946
Universities and colleges in Nueva Ecija
Protestant schools in the Philippines
1946 establishments in the Philippines
Association of Christian Universities and Colleges in Asia